Robert Ballard (born 1942) is a former United States Navy officer and oceanographer.

Robert Ballard may also refer to:
 Robert Ballard II ( or 1575 – after 1650), French lutenist and composer
 Robert Ballard (athlete) (born 1964), Australian athlete

See also
 Robert Ballard Long (1771–1825), officer of the British and Hanoverian Armies